The 2018 IIHF U18 World Championship was the 20th IIHF World U18 Championship. The tournament was played from 19 to 29 April 2018 in Chelyabinsk and Magnitogorsk, Russia. United States lost to Finland.

Top Division

Match officials
12 referees and 10 linesmen were selected for the tournament.

Referees
 Jonathan Alarie
 Kenneth Anderson
 Geoffrey Barcelo
 Christoffer Holm
 Benjamin Hoppe
 Ken Mollard
 Denis Naumov
 Kristijan Nikolic
 Daniel Pražák
 Peter Stano
 Kristian Vikman
 Milan Zrnič

Linesmen
 Maxime Chaput
 Daniel Hynek
 Balazs Kovacs
 Jan-Christian Müller
 Lauri Nikulainen
 Tobias Nordlander
 Charlie O'Connor
 Ulrich Pardatscher
 Nikita Shalagin
 Dmitry Shishlo

Preliminary round

Group A

All times are local (UTC+5).

Group B

Relegation round

Playoff round

Bracket

Quarterfinals

Semifinals

Bronze medal game

Final

Final standings

Statistics

Scoring leaders
List shows the top ten skaters sorted by points, then goals.

 GP = Games played; G = Goals; A = Assists; Pts = Points; +/− = Plus-minus; PIM = Penalties In MinutesSource: IIHF.com

Leading goaltenders
Only the top five goaltenders, based on save percentage, who have played 40% of their team's minutes are included in this list.

 TOI = Time on ice (minutes:seconds); SA = Shots against; GA = Goals against; GAA = Goals against average; Sv% = Save percentage; SO = ShutoutsSource: IIHF.com

Tournament awards

Most Valuable Player
 Forward:  Jack Hughes

All-star team
 Goaltender:  Olof Lindbom
 Defencemen:  Cameron York,  Anton Malyshev
 Forwards:  Jack Hughes,  Oliver Wahlstrom,  Niklas Nordgren
Source: IIHF.com 

IIHF best player awards
 Goaltender:  Olof Lindbom
 Defenceman:  Adam Boqvist
 Forward:  Jack Hughes
Source: IIHF.com

Division I

Division I A
The Division I A tournament was held in Riga, Latvia, from 2 to 8 April 2018.

Division I B
The Division I B tournament was held in Kyiv, Ukraine, from 14 to 20 April 2018.

Division II

Division II A
The Division II A tournament was held in Tallinn, Estonia, from 1 to 7 April 2018.

Division II B
The Division II B tournament  was held in Zagreb, Croatia, from 24 to 30 March 2018.

Division III

Division III A
The Division III A tournament was held in Erzurum, Turkey, from 26 March to 1 April 2018.

Division III B
The Division III B tournament was held in Queenstown, New Zealand, from 26 to 28 April 2018.

References

External links
2018 IIHF Ice Hockey U18 World Championship
IIHF.com

 
IIHF World U18 Championships
IIHF World U18 Championships
2018
2017–18 in Russian ice hockey
Sport in Chelyabinsk Oblast
IIHF World U18 Championships